Rachel Susan Dratch (born February 22, 1966) is an American actress, comedian, and writer. After she graduated from Dartmouth College, she moved to Chicago to study improvisational theatre at The Second City and ImprovOlympic. Dratch's breakthrough role was her tenure as a cast member on the NBC sketch comedy series Saturday Night Live from 1999 to 2006. During her time on SNL, she portrayed a variety of roles including Debbie Downer. She has since occasionally returned to SNL as a guest portraying Senator Amy Klobuchar.

Other television credits include The King of Queens, Monk, and 30 Rock. She has also played the recurring role of Wanda Jo Oliver on Last Week Tonight with John Oliver. She acted in films including Click (2006), I Now Pronounce You Chuck and Larry (2007), Sisters (2015), and Wine Country (2019).

In 2022, Dratch made her Broadway stage debut in POTUS: Or, Behind Every Great Dumbass Are Seven Women Trying to Keep Him Alive for which she earned a Tony Award for Best Featured Actress in a Play nomination. In 2012 she published her autobiographical book Girl Walks Into a Bar...: Comedy Calamities, Dating Disasters, and a Midlife Miracle.

Early life
Dratch was born on February 22, 1966, in Lexington, Massachusetts, the daughter of Elaine Ruth (née Soloway), a transportation director, and Paul Dratch, a radiologist. Both of Dratch's parents were Reform Jews. Dratch attended Hebrew school and had a bat mitzvah. She is religiously  nonobservant as an adult, and instead characterizes the faith she was born into as part of her cultural heritage.

Her younger brother, Daniel, is a television producer and writer; his credits include the TV series Anger Management. Dratch says she grew up as the "class clown type" attending William Diamond Middle School and Lexington High School in Lexington. She said while performing in high school plays she gravitated towards acting in comedies more often than in dramas.

Dratch attended the National Theater Institute at the Eugene O'Neill Theater Center in the fall of 1985 and graduated from Dartmouth College in 1988. She majored in drama and psychology and was a member of the improvisational comedy group "Said and Done". While at Dartmouth Dratch was a classmate of Kirsten Gillibrand.

Career
Dratch was a member of the mainstage cast of The Second City comedy troupe for four years. She received the Joseph Jefferson award for Best Actress in a Revue for the two revues in which she performed: Paradigm Lost and Promisekeepers, Losers Weepers. At The Second City, she performed alongside future SNL head writers Adam McKay and Tina Fey, as well as future 30 Rock performer Scott Adsit. The first incarnation of her SNL "Wicked" sketch was performed in The Second City's Paradigm Lost. 

In addition to acting, Dratch also played the cello onstage. The theater also hosted the first incarnation of Dratch & Fey (her critically praised two-woman show with Tina Fey), which was later performed at the Upright Citizens Brigade Theatre in New York, where it was dubbed "the funniest thing to be found on any New York comedy stage" by Time Out New York.

Dratch has appeared in several films, including Martin & Orloff, The Hebrew Hammer, Down with Love, Dickie Roberts: Former Child Star, Click, I Now Pronounce You Chuck and Larry, Spring Breakdown, and My Life in Ruins. She also has joined fellow SNL cast members on A.S.S.S.S.C.A.T.: Improv, which aired September 7, 2005, on the Bravo channel.  

Dratch also made television appearances on NBC's Third Watch and in a recurring role on The King of Queens (playing Denise, the on-off girlfriend of Spence, who worked in a bowling alley). Other television appearances include Monk, Frasier, Wizards of Waverly Place, 30 Rock, Aqua Teen Hunger Force, Inside Amy Schumer, Ugly Betty, and more recently, in season five of The Middle. 

She also appeared online with comedian Billy Eichner in a spoof of Jay-Z and Alicia Keys's "Empire State of Mind", titled "Forest Hills State of Mind."

Dratch was originally cast in the role of Jenna Maroney on 30 Rock as "Jenna DeCarlo", and the original pilot episode features her in the role. After feedback from test audiences, the role was ultimately recast with Jane Krakowski. She went on to play a variety of small guest roles in several episodes of the first season, including Barbara Walters, Elizabeth Taylor, a cat trainer, a custodian, a blue monster, and a doctor.

On March 19, 2012, Dratch's memoir, Girl Walks into a Bar...: Comedy Calamities, Dating Disasters, and a Midlife Miracle was published. In it, Dratch recounts her experiences after being recast in the 30 Rock pilot, including the birth of her child.

In 2016 Dratch hosted the program Rachel Dratch's Late Night Snack on truTV. The sketch comedy program featured Dratch playing a waitress who doesn't talk in wraparound segments. Dratch also appeared in sketches and the show ran for two seasons.

Saturday Night Live
Her tenure at SNL spanned 1999 to 2006. Dratch's recurring characters included Denise, a Boston teen; Sheldon, the junior-high-school boy from Wake up, Wakefield; one of the Luvahs (with Will Ferrell, as two pretentious professors); Abe Scheinwald, a Hollywood producer with a terrible acquisition record; and, perhaps most memorably, Debbie Downer, a depressed woman who brought others' moods down while saying grim non sequiturs. 

In December 2011, she made a guest appearance on Saturday Night Lives Christmas show, hosted by former cast member Jimmy Fallon. On April 15, 2017, she made another guest appearance with host Jimmy Fallon. On February 3, 2018, she made a guest appearance as a "Patriot of New England" in a Revolutionary War-themed sketch parodying the fans of the New England Patriots and Philadelphia Eagles in advance of Super Bowl LII. 

On September 29, 2018, she appeared as Senator Amy Klobuchar in the opening sketch, about the confirmation hearings of Supreme Court nominee Brett Kavanaugh. She continued to reprise  role of Klobuchar during sketches on the 2020 Democratic Party Presidential primary debates, specifically the fifth and sixth debates in November and December 2019.

Personal life
In her book Girl Walks Into a Bar...,  Dratch discusses meeting John Wahl, a consultant in the natural foods industry, in a bar in 2009. Six months later, Dratch learned she was pregnant, and on August 24, 2010, Dratch gave birth to Eli Benjamin, her son with Wahl. In an October 2010 interview, Dratch told People that her pregnancy at age 44 shocked her because she "had bought into all this stuff about, 'Once you're over 40 [pregnancy becomes difficult]’" and had "gone through the whole process of letting go of [the idea of having kids]." As of 2019, Dratch and Wahl are not a couple, but are on good terms and live near each other to parent their son.

Audiobooks 
 Girl Walks into a Bar...: Comedy Calamities, Dating Disasters, and a Midlife Miracle, 2012

Filmography

Television

Film

Theater

Web

References

External links

1966 births
Actresses from Massachusetts
American women comedians
American film actresses
21st-century American memoirists
American stage actresses
American television actresses
Dartmouth College alumni
Jewish American actresses
Jewish American female comedians
Living people
People from Lexington, Massachusetts
American Reform Jews
20th-century American actresses
21st-century American actresses
Writers from Massachusetts
21st-century American women writers
American women memoirists
American sketch comedians
Comedians from Massachusetts
American voice actresses
Lexington High School alumni
20th-century American comedians
21st-century American comedians
21st-century American Jews